comeherefloyd is an mp3 blog based in New Jersey founded in 2017.

History 
New Jersey-based mp3 blog comeherefloyd has premiered songs and music videos for a variety of artists. The company has stated that "most of the time our attention concentrates on Indie-Pop, Indie-Rock, [and] Korean Indie-Pop."

In 2019, Earmilk shared details of comeherefloyd's exclusive interview with American songwriter Waldo Witt.

Contributors 
In 2018, New Jersey music critic Tris McCall began writing for comeherefloyd.

References

External links 

 Official website

Music blogs